III  is Stanton Moore's third studio solo album released 2006. As each of Moore's solo albums have had unique character, III features keyboardist Robert Walter and guitarist Will Bernard for a 1970s-like soul funk with a "sense of authenticity" as "artists who live it."

It was recorded at Preservation Hall by Mike Napolitano with equipment borrowed from Ani DiFranco. It closes with songs chosen as a response to the aftermath of Hurricane Katrina.

Personnel 
Stanton Moore: drums (Galactic)
Robert Walter: Hammond B3 organ (Greyboy Allstars)
Will Bernard: guitar (Motherbug)

Guest artists
Skerik: tenor saxophonics (Les Claypool, Critters Buggin)
Mark Mullins: trombone (Harry Connick, Jr., Bonerama)

Track listing 
"Poison Pushy"
"Licorice"
"Big 'Uns Get the Ball Rolling"
"Chilcock"
"(Don't Be Comin' with No) Weak Sauce"
"Dunkin' in the Deep"
"Maple Plank"
"Water from an Ancient Well"
"When the Levee Breaks"
"I Shall Not Be Moved"

References

External links 
Preservation Hall - official site
Stanton Moore - official site

2006 albums
Stanton Moore albums